Yde et Olive is a thirteenth-century chanson de geste written in decasyllabic monorhyming laisses in a Picard-influenced dialect of Old French. It is one episode in a cycle of sequels to Huon de Bordeaux that follow various members of his family. Following the Chanson d'Esclarmonde, the story of Huon's wife and Yde's grandmother, and Clarisse et Florent, the story of Yde's parents, the story of Yde is punctuated by a poem titled Croissant, which some scholars edit separately and which tells the story of Yde and Olive's son. The main story of Yde's adventures then picks up again. "Yde et Olive" is a relatively unstudied chanson compared with its counterparts in the Huon series.

It is sometimes considered the earliest Old French adaptation of the myth of Iphis in Ovid's Metamorphoses, though some scholars have questioned whether this ancient cognate is anything more than coincidentally similar. Likewise, it has been postulated that the story was worked into dramatic form in the Miracle de la fille d'un roy (1454), but scholars have also rejected this hypothesis, claiming that the transference of the motif of a cross-dressing heroine escaping her father's incestuous desires results from an oral tradition rather than direct textual influence. The play does not significantly deviate from the chanson except in its finale (the heroine Ysabelle's true sex is discovered at the end, where she restored to womanhood and married to the king instead of remaining married to his daughter). Caroline Cazanave's quintessential book on the Huon sequels contains an extensive discussion of the text and the manuscript tradition.

Manuscript and editions 
The story of Yde and Olive appears in two manuscripts:

 Paris, Bibliothèque nationale de France, français, 1451, f. 225r (short summary of the text)
 Turin, Biblioteca nazionale universitaria, L. II. 14, f. 389va-395va and 397rb-399va

The latter contains the only surviving complete version of the story of Yde and Olive. The Turin manuscript is an illuminated and beautifully decorated book that fortunately survived the fire that ravaged the library in 1904. The manuscript has since been restored several times, though some pages have been permanently damaged.

In the early sixteenth century the cycle of sequels was rewritten into prose as part of Les prouesses et faictz merveilleux du noble huon de bordeaulx, which was then translated into Middle English and printed as The Boke of Duke Huon of Burdeux by John Bourchier, Lord Berners, for Francis Hastings, Earl of Huntingdon, early in the century, to be printed twice more, c. 1570 and in 1601. The stories were developed into a novel-like retelling.

The first part of Yde's story was recently translated into Modern English by Mounawar Abbouchi in Medieval Feminist Forum: A Journal of Gender and Sexuality. The translation is accompanied by a facing-page edition of the original text and is accessible online. The sequels have previously been edited twice, once by Max Schweigel's in 1889, and a second time in a 1977 dissertation by Barbara Anne Brewka at Vanderbilt University.

Plot

The marriage of Florent to Clarisse is briefly recounted. A triumphant Florent returns to Aragon and is crowned king after the death of his father, Garin. Shortly after, Clarisse finds herself with child, but fears her pregnancy, and with good reason as the queen dies giving birth to a daughter named Yde. Florent goes into prolonged mourning, ignoring his kingly and fatherly duties, and refusing to remarry despite the insistence of his barons. However, as Yde grows into a young woman and the resemblance to her mother grows more pronounced, her father falls in love with her and decides to marry her. Horrified by the prospect, Yde disguises herself as a man, steals her father's horse, and flees the country. She embarks on a series of chivalric adventures that eventually lead her to Rome, where she begins to serve the king, Oton. Impressed by her valor, Oton decides to marry Yde to his one and only daughter, Olive, and make her his heir. Finding no other way out, Yde reluctantly agrees to wed Olive. The couple practices abstinence for fifteen days after their wedding, but Yde finally finds herself unable to resist her wife's urging that they consummate the marriage and confesses her secret to Olive. The latter reassures her that her secret is safe, but their conversation is overheard and reported to the king, who vows to have them both burned if the story is true. In order to learn the truth, Oton summons Yde to bathe with him. The two girls believe that all is lost and pray for salvation, and at the last minute, an angel descends from heaven to appeal to the king not to test such a tried and true vassal. The angel then announces that Yde is now a man, that Oton will die eight days hence, and that Yde and Olive will conceive a child who will be named Croissant that very night.

The episode some scholars have called Croissant follows, telling of the deeds of Yde and Olive's son. The Yde et Olive narrative then picks up with Florent dead and Yde returning to Aragon as the rightful heir to claim his throne.

References

Citations

Bibliography

Editions & Translation

Abbouchi, Mounawar. Abbouchi, Mounawar.  "Yde and Olive." Medieval Feminist Forum. Subsidia Series no. 8. Medieval Texts in Translation 5. (2018).
Brewka, Barbara Anne. "Esclarmonde, Clarisse et Florent, Yde et Olive I, Croissant, Yde et Olive II, Huon et les Géants, Sequels to Huon de Bordeaux, as Contained in Turin MS. L.II.14: an Edition." PhD Diss. Vanderbilt University, 1977.
Schweigel, Max, ed. Esclarmonde, Clarisse et Florent, Yde et Olive: Drei Fortsetzungen der chanson von Huon de Bordeaux, nach der einzigen Turiner Handschrift. Marburg: N.G. Elwert, 1889.

Adaptations

Prose
Les prouesses et faicts du trespreux noble et vaillant Huon de Bordeaux, pair de France et duc de Guyenne. Lyon: Benoit Gigaud, 1587.

English Prose
Lee, S. L., ed. The Boke of Duke Huon de Bordeux. Done into English by Sir John Bourchier, Lord Berners, and printed by Wynkyn de Worde about 1534 A.D. 3 Parts. Edited from the unique copy of the first edition. Early English Text Society. Original Series 40, 41, 43. London: N. Trübner, 1884; New York: Kraus Reprint, 1975, 1981.

Miracle Play
Paris, Gaston and Ulysse Robert, eds. "Le miracle de la fille d'un roy." Les miracles de Nostre Dames par personnages. Vol. 7. Paris: Librairie de Firmin Didot et Cie, 1883.

External links 

 "Yde and Olive" full text in Medieval Feminist Forum: A Journal of Gender and Sexuality.
 Yde et Olive, Arlima.

French poems
Epic poems in French
Chansons de geste
Matter of France
Medieval literature
LGBT-related plays